In radiology, the steeple sign is a radiologic sign found on a frontal neck radiograph where subglottic tracheal narrowing produces the shape of a church steeple within the trachea itself. The presence of the steeple sign supports a diagnosis of croup, usually caused by paramyxoviruses. it can also be defined as the replacement of the usual squared-shoulder appearance of the subglottic area  by cone shaped narrowing just distal to the vocal cords. This is called the steeple or pencil-point sign.

References

External links
Frontal radiograph demonstrating steeple sign

Radiologic signs
Respiratory system imaging